Thomas Sherrer Ross Boase  (31 August 1898 – 14 April 1974) was a British art historian, university teacher, and Vice-Chancellor of Oxford University.

Early life and education

Thomas Boase was born in Dundee, Scotland, to Charles Millet Boase (d. 1921), operator of a bleaching mill at Claverhouse, outside Dundee, of which the Boase family were part-owners, and his wife Anne. Boase was educated at a day preparatory school and then at Rugby School in England (1912–17).

Oxford 
He won a scholarship to Oxford for an essay on Lorenzo de' Medici. Boase studied Modern History at Magdalen College, Oxford, from 1919 to 1921. At Oxford he studied under the historian Francis Fortescue Urquhart (1868–1934). Boase was a Fellow and Tutor at Hertford College from 1922 to 1937.

Involvement in World War I and II

World War I 
He fought on the Western Front during World War I in the Oxford and Buckinghamshire Light Infantry (1917–19) and was awarded the Military Cross.

World War II 
During World War II, he worked in the Government Code and Cipher School at Bletchley Park, followed by the RAF in Cairo, Egypt, from 1939 to 1941. He was then in charge of British Council activities in the Middle East, also based in Cairo, from 1943 to 1945.

Career

Courtauld Institute of Art 
From 1937 to 1947, Boase was Director of the Courtauld Institute of Art in London. While at the Courtauld he contributed photographs that are now held in the Conway Library of art and architecture. During this period, he was also Professor of History of Art at the University of London.

Later life 
From 1947 to 1968, Boase was President of Magdalen College. In 1948, he contributed to the Samuel Courtauld Memorial Exhibition at Tate Britain. He was a Trustee of the National Gallery (1947–53) and the British Museum (1950–69). Boase was involved in a 'scandal' while Chairman of the Trustees of the National Gallery in 1952. He served as Vice-Chancellor of Oxford University from 1958 to 1960. Boase became a Fellow of the British Academy in 1961. He was Slade Professor of Fine Art at Oxford for 1963–64. In 1967, he was elected a member of the American Philosophical Society. He was also a member of the Advisory Council of the Victoria and Albert Museum (1947–70).

Death 
His obituary for The British Academy was written by J.J.G.Alexander, another Conway Library photographer.

Partial Bibliography 
Boniface VIII,Series: Makers of the Middle Ages, Constable, 1933.

St. Francis of Assisi, Series: Great Lives (74), Duckworth, 1936.

English Romanesque illuminations, Oxford University Press, 1951.

The Oxford History of English Art : Vol III. English art, 1100–1216, Oxford University Press, 1953.

English Illumination of the Thirteenth and Fourteenth Centuries, Bodleian Library, Oxford, 1954.

The York Psalter in the Library of the Hunterian Museum, Glasgow, Faber & Faber Ltd, 1962.

 Macklin and Bowyer, Warburg Institute, 1963.

Castles and Churches of the Crusading Kingdom, Oxford University Press, 1967.

St Francis of Assisi, Thames & Hudson, 1968.

Kingdoms and Strongholds of the Crusaders,Thames and Hudson, 1971.

Death in the Middle Ages : mortality, judgment and remembrance, Thames and Hudson, 1972.

Nebuchadnezzar : 34 paintings and 18 drawings, (with Arthur Boyd), Thames and Hudson, 1972.

References

External links 
 BOASE, Thomas Sherrer Ross (1898–1974) archive, Courtauld Institute of Art. (Includes a biography.)
 Books by Thomas Sherrer Ross Boase from Alibris.

 
 
 

1898 births
1974 deaths
People educated at Rugby School
British art historians
Alumni of Magdalen College, Oxford
Fellows of Hertford College, Oxford
Directors of the Courtauld Institute of Art
Fellows of Magdalen College, Oxford
Presidents of Magdalen College, Oxford
Vice-Chancellors of the University of Oxford
Fellows of the British Academy
Trustees of the British Museum
People associated with the National Gallery, London
People associated with the Victoria and Albert Museum
Bletchley Park people
British Army personnel of World War I
Recipients of the Military Cross
Grand Crosses with Star and Sash of the Order of Merit of the Federal Republic of Germany
Oxfordshire and Buckinghamshire Light Infantry officers
Slade Professors of Fine Art (University of Oxford)
People from Dundee
Royal Air Force personnel of World War II
Members of the American Philosophical Society